Dzhanga (Dargwa: Джангани) is a rural locality (a selo) in Gubdensky Selsoviet, Karabudakhkentsky District, Republic of Dagestan, Russia. The population was 1,203 as of 2010. There are 9 streets.

Geography 
Dzhanga is located 37 km southeast of Karabudakhkent (the district's administrative centre) by road. Siragi and Leninkent are the nearest rural localities.

Nationalities 
Dargin people live there.

References 

Rural localities in Karabudakhkentsky District